Tropistethus is a genus of true bugs belonging to the family Lygaeidae.

The genus was first described by Franz Xaver Fieber in 1861.

The species of this genus are found in Eurasia.

Species:
 Tropistethus fasciatus Ferrari, 1874
 Tropistethus holosericus

References

Lygaeidae